Parliamentary elections were held in Georgia on 31 October and 21 November 2020 to elect the 150 members of Parliament. The ruling Georgian Dream party led by Prime Minister Giorgi Gakharia won re-election for a third term in office, making it the first party in Georgian history to do so. The election also saw a record number of opposition parties elected to parliament. 

The opposition boycotted the second round of the elections and called on voters to abstain; turnout in the second round was subsequently only 26.29%.

Electoral system
In the previous election, 150 members of Parliament were elected by two methods; 77 were from a single nationwide constituency using closed list proportional representation with a 5% electoral threshold which was to be lowered to 3% for the 2020 election. The other 73 were elected in single-member constituencies using two-round system, in which candidates had to receive over 50% of the valid vote to win in the first round. A second round was held between the top two candidates if there was no winner in the first round.

New electoral law 

In June 2019, Georgian Dream announced plans to change the electoral system to full party-list proportional representation without an electoral threshold. Despite being supported by opposition parties, the legislation failed to be passed as only 101 of the 150 MPs voted in favour, fewer than the required 75% to change the electoral law.

After the failure of the proposed amendments to be passed with the 75% of votes from parliamentary deputies, the government and the opposition held several rounds of talks, and in early March 2020, a memorandum of understanding was issued from all the parties of the political spectrum. The new electoral law stipulates that 120 deputies will be elected via proportional representation, while another 30 will be elected from single-member constituencies. The constituencies will be drawn according to the instructions given by the Venice Commission, and the Georgian judiciary. For proportional representation seats, the electoral threshold is 1%. For single-member constituencies, a candidate will gain the status of a parliamentary deputy if they gain 50% of votes in the first round. If that does not happen, the top two candidates will take part in a run-off whose winner will be elected. The US Embassy at Tbilisi lauded these agreements, as did leading European diplomats who have desired the 2020 elections to be free and transparent. No party can obtain a majority of seats without getting at least 40% of votes from the electorate.

In its first hearing on 21 June, Georgian parliament passed the electoral reforms. 136 MPs voted for these reforms, while 5 MPs voted against. On second reading of the bill, 115 MPs voted for the reforms, while 3 voted against and 1 abstained. The opposition United National Movement and European Georgia did not participate in the voting, as they demanded release of opposition figures i.e. Giorgi Rurua.

On 29 June 2020, the electoral reforms were adopted by the Georgian Parliament, with 117 out of 142 members voting in support for the reforms. U.S. Secretary of State Mike Pompeo welcomed these electoral reforms, calling on the Parliament and officials to respect the will of the people.

Further changes to the election code

The Georgian parliament passed further electoral reforms; however, the ultimate constitutional changes came from OSCE-ODIHR suggestions to the existing electoral code rather than the negotiations between the government and opposition. These include the regulation of election ads, the involvement of non-government entities in the electoral process, the regulation of the publication of opinion polls, and introducing a gender quota of 25%. The quota will remain intact till 2028. No fewer than one in three candidates in each party must belong to other gender. 94 MPs supported these reforms, while European Georgia and UNM boycotted the vote. The US embassy praised the reforms, though voiced concerns over the remaining gaps in the electoral legislation, including lack of transparency in selecting Election Commission Members, dispute resolution, voter intimidation and providing for alternative channels to campaign during the COVID-19 pandemic.

Pre-election  period and campaign
Ahead of the elections, UNM, European Georgia, Labour Party, and New Georgia formed an alliance. On 19 June 2020, they announced a joint slate of six candidates, who will compete in elections in Tbilisi. Newly formed party Lelo for Georgia  refused to join the alliance. Analysts say that although Georgian Dream suffered a dip in popularity in the aftermath of crackdowns on the 2019-2020 anti-corruption protests, its relatively successful handling of the COVID-19 pandemic has led to a boost in popularity. 

Problems soon began to emerge in the alliance. Leader of the Citizens Party Aleko Elisashvili left the alliance, accusing the opposition of acting in their own self-interests, and espousing pro-Russian views. The opposition, in turn, accused Elisashvili of trying to ruin the alliance's unity.

By 19 June 2020, the opposition alliance consisted of 31 political parties.

The opposition Girchi Party said that if it enters parliament, it will give away Tesla cars to voters who turn out in elections via lottery. They said that they would purchase the cars with the state funding awarded to parliamentary parties.

On 4 September 2020, the election commission said that 66 parties had successfully registered to run in the 2020 election.

Opinion polls

Conduct
Al Jazeera correspondent Robin Forestier-Walker reported that most voters were able to cast their ballots "safely and freely", although there were incidents of violence. The OSCE Parliamentary Assembly stated that "elections were competitive", while also reported "pervasive allegations of pressure on voters and blurring of the line between the ruling party and the state". The United States embassy in Georgia, commenting on the OSCE statement, said: "We call on all parties to address these deficiencies in advance of the second round and in future elections. These efforts to corrupt the electoral process through voter intimidation, vote buying, interfering with ballot secrecy, blurring of party and official activities, and violence against election observers and journalists, while not sufficient to invalidate the results, continue to mar Georgia’s electoral process and are unacceptable."

Results

Four exit polls showed ruling Georgian Dream leading in the elections. An exit poll conducted by Imedi TV showed Georgian Dream leading with 55% of votes, while according to polls conducted by Rustavi 2 showed GD securing 52.26% of votes cast. Mtavari Arkhi and Formula TV consecutively showed the party winning 41% and 46% of votes. Shortly after, Georgian Dream declared victory. However, the opposition refused to concede defeat and claimed that they had secured enough votes to form a coalition government. UNM leader David Kirtadze said, "This is not a real picture."

By constituency

Aftermath

Crisis in Georgia

Following the first round, protests were held in Tbilisi, with around 45,000 people attending a protest on 8 November that was eventually broken up with water cannons.

Eight opposition parties stated that they would not attend parliamentary sittings. On 3 November 2020, all Georgian opposition parties signed a joint statement renouncing their seats in the parliament until the parliamentary elections (which they consider null and void) are repeated.

Notes

References 

Georgia
Parliamentary elections in Georgia (country)
2020 in Georgia (country)
Election and referendum articles with incomplete results